The Fiji white-eye (Zosterops explorator) is a species of passerine bird in the white-eye family Zosteropidae. The species is also known as Layard's white-eye.

It is endemic to the islands of Viti Levu, Vanua Levu, Taveuni, Kadavu, and Ovalau in Fiji, where it is a common bird of forests. Where it co-occurs with the closely related silvereye it is more common in denser forest.

It is a typical small white-eye of the genus Zosterops, similar in appearance to the silvereye, although the plumage is much yellower, it is chunkier and has a complete eye-ring. The back is olive green and the throat and belly yellow. The call is described as "a high pitched seeu-seeu".

The Fiji white-eye feeds by gleaning insects from shrubs and trees. It will join mixed-species feeding flocks with other Fijian birds, including silvereyes. It also feeds lower down in the trees than silvereyes.

References

Fiji white-eye
Endemic birds of Fiji
Fiji white-eye
Taxonomy articles created by Polbot